Kamal Haasan (born 7 November 1954) is an Indian actor, filmmaker, screenwriter, playback singer, television presenter and politician who works mainly in Tamil cinema and has also appeared in some Telugu, Malayalam, Hindi, Kannada and Bengali films. He has been recognised as an influence for actors and filmmakers in the Tamil film industry. He is also known for introducing many new technologies and cosmetics to the Indian film industry. He has won numerous accolades, including Four National Film Awards, Nine Tamil Nadu State Film Awards, Four Nandi Awards, One Rashtrapati Award, Two Filmfare Awards and 17 Filmfare Awards South. He was awarded the Kalaimamani Award in 1984, the Padma Shri in 1990, the Padma Bhushan in 2014 and the Ordre des Arts et des Lettres (Chevalier) in 2016. 

Haasan started his career as a child artist in the 1960 Tamil-language film Kalathur Kannamma, for which he won the President's Gold Medal. His breakthrough as a lead actor came in the 1975 drama Apoorva Raagangal, directed by K. Balachander, in which he played a rebellious youth who falls in love with an older woman. He won his first National Film Award for his portrayal of a guileless school teacher who cares for a woman who suffers from retrograde amnesia in Moondram Pirai (1982). He was noted for his performances in K. Viswanath's Swathi Muthyam (1986), Mani Ratnam's Nayakan (1987), and S. Shankar's Indian (1996). Since then he has appeared in films including Hey Ram (2000), Virumaandi (2004), Dasavathaaram (2008) in which he played ten roles, Vishwaroopam (2013) and Vikram (2022). His production company, Raaj Kamal Films International, has produced several of his films.

For his philanthropic efforts, Haasan received the first Abraham Kovoor National Award in 2004. He was project ambassador for the Hridayaragam 2010 event, which raised funds for an orphanage for HIV/AIDS-affected children. In September 2010, Haasan launched a children's cancer relief fund and gave roses to children with cancer at Sri Ramachandra University in Porur, Chennai. Haasan was nominated by the Indian Prime Minister Narendra Modi for the Swachh Bharat Mission. On 21 February 2018, Haasan formally launched his political party, Makkal Needhi Maiam (lit. People's Justice Centre). He has also received the Golden Visa from United Arab Emirates.

Early life and family

Haasan was born on 7 November 1954, in a Tamil Iyengar Brahmin family, to D. Srinivasan, who was a lawyer and freedom fighter, and Rajalakshmi, who was a housewife. Haasan was initially named as Parthasarathy. His father later changed his name to Kamal Haasan. His brothers, Charuhasan (born 1930) and Chandrahasan (born 1936), have also acted. Haasan's sister, Nalini (born 1946), is a classical dancer. He received his primary education in Paramakudi before moving to Madras (now Chennai) as his brothers pursued their higher education. Haasan continued his education in Santhome, Madras, and was attracted towards film and fine arts as encouraged by his father.

Film career

1960–1963
When a physician friend of his mother, visited A. V. Meiyappan (AVM) to treat his wife, she brought Haasan with her. Apparently impressed by his demeanor AVM's son, M. Saravanan, recommended him for their production Kalathur Kannamma. Haasan won the Rashtrapati Award (President's gold medal) for his performance in Kalathur Kannamma at age six and starred in five more films as a child. He debuted in the Malayalam film industry with Kannum Karalum (1962). Upon his father's encouragement, he joined a repertory company (T. K. S. Nataka Sabha) headed by T. K. Shanmugam. In the meanwhile, he continued his education at the Hindu Higher Secondary School in Triplicane. His time with the theatre company shaped Haasan's craft and kindled his interest in makeup.

1970–1975
After a seven-year hiatus from films, Haasan returned to the industry as a dance assistant, apprenticing under choreographer Thankappan. During this time, Haasan made brief appearances in some films including a few uncredited roles. His first appearance came in the 1970 film Maanavan, in which he appeared in a dance sequence. He went on to assist Thankappan in films such as Annai Velankani (1971) and Kasi Yathirai (1973). In the former he had a supporting role and worked as an assistant director. His first full-fledged role came in K. Balachander's Tamil film Arangetram (1973). Balachander cast him as the antagonist in his Sollathaan Ninaikkiren (1973). Haasan went on to do supporting roles in films such as Gumasthavin Magal (1974), Aval Oru Thodar Kathai (1974) and Naan Avanillai. The same year, he played his first lead role in the Malayalam film, Kanyakumari, for which he won his first Filmfare Award. In Tamil cinema, he had his breakthrough as a lead actor in Balachander's Apoorva Raagangal. He played a rebellious young man who falls in love with an older woman. For this character portrayal, Haasan learned to play the mridangam. The role won him his second Filmfare Award.

1976–1979
In 1976, Haasan appeared Balachander's Manmadha Leelai; this was followed by Oru Oodhappu Kan Simittugiradhu (directed by S. P. Muthuraman), which won him his third Filmfare Award. Haasan later appeared in the Balachander drama Moondru Mudichu. Avargal (1977) concerned the women's movement and, for this role, he learned ventriloquism. It was remade in Telugu as Idi Katha Kaadu (1979), with Haasan reprising his role. 16 Vayathinile, in which he played a village bumpkin, which won him a fourth consecutive Best Actor award. In 1977 Haasan starred in his first Kannada film, Kokila, the directorial debut of friend and mentor Balu Mahendra. That year he also appeared in a Bengali film, Kabita, a remake of the Tamil film Aval Oru Thodar Kathai. In 1978 Haasan made his Telugu film debut with a lead role in the cross-cultural romantic Maro Charitra, directed by Balachander. His fifth consecutive Filmfare Award resulted from Sigappu Rojakkal, a thriller in which he played a psychopathic sexual killer. He appeared in the Malayalam film Eeta, for which he won his sixth Filmfare Award. He first played opposite to the Sridevi in the 1977 Malayalam movie Satyavan Savithri directed by P.G. Viswambharan, this combination was later on well-accepted and celebrated. In the 1979 Telugu film Sommokadidi Sokokadidi, Haasan played two parts. This was also his first collaboration with director Singeetam Srinivasa Rao. He appeared in the musical Ninaithale Inikkum, a snake-horror film Neeya and Kalyanaraman. At the end of the 1970s he had six regional Best Actor Filmfare Awards, including four consecutive Best Tamil Actor Awards.

1980–1989
Haasan's films during the 1980s included 1980 Tamil-language Varumayin Niram Sivappu, the film was simultaneously shot in Telugu as Aakali Rajyam, in which he played an unemployed youth and earned him a first Filmfare Award in Telugu. In 1980 he appeared in the drama film Ullasa Paravaigal, Guru and Maria My Darling. Haasan made his debut in Hindi cinema with Ek Duuje Ke Liye (1981), the remake of his own acted Telugu-language film Maro Charitra directed by K. Balachander (which earned him his first Filmfare Hindi-language nomination). He made his 100th film appearance in 1981 in Raja Paarvai, debuting as a producer. Despite the film's relatively poor box-office performance, his portrayal of a blind session violinist earned him a Filmfare Award. After a year of starring in commercial films, Haasan won the first of three National Awards for Best Actor for his portrayal of a schoolteacher caring for an amnesia patient in Balu Mahendra's Moondram Pirai, later reprising his role in the Hindi version, Sadma. During this period he focused on Bollywood remakes of his Tamil films, including Yeh To Kamaal Ho Gaya and Zara Si Zindagi. In 1983 he appeared in Sagara Sangamam, directed by K. Viswanath. His portrayal of an alcoholic classical dancer won him his first Nandi Award for Best Actor and his second Filmfare Best Telugu Actor Award.

After 1984's multistarrer Raaj Tilak, Haasan appeared in Saagar (released 1985), winning the Filmfare Best Actor Award and nominated for the Best Supporting Actor award. The film was India's representative for the Best Foreign Language Oscar in 1985. He left Bollywood temporarily after Geraftaar and Dekha Pyar Tumhara to feature in Japanil Kalyanaraman (a sequel to his 1979 Kalyanaraman).

In 1986, Haasan produced the technically brilliant Vikram and collaborated with Kodandarami Reddy for Oka Radha Iddaru Krishnulu and then K. Viswanath in Swathi Muthyam, playing an autistic person who tries to change society and won him his second Nandi Award for Best Actor. it was India's entry for Best Foreign Language Film at the Academy Awards in 1986. These Tollywood films found him a large audience in Andhra Pradesh, and many of his later Tamil films were dubbed into Telugu.

Following Punnagai Mannan (in which he played two roles, including a satire of Charlie Chaplin as Chaplin Chellappa) and Kadhal Parisu, Haasan appeared in Mani Ratnam's 1987 film Nayakan. He received his second Indian National Award for his performance; Nayakan was submitted by India as its entry for Best Foreign Language Film at the 1987 Academy Awards, and is on the Time's All-Time 100 Movies list. Haasan appeared in his only silent film to date: Pushpaka Vimana (1987) a black comedy film, in which he played an unemployed youth and earned him a first Filmfare Award in Kannada. In 1988 he appeared Unnal Mudiyum Thambi, Malayalam film Daisy and Sathyaa which were his own productions. Haasan's all four films of 1989 were major success, Apoorva Sagodharargal, where he played a dwarf, then Chanakyan, an original Malayalam film, later Vettri Vizhaa (where he played an amnesiac) and finally Haasan played two parts in Indrudu Chandrudu, winning the Filmfare Best Actor and won him his third Nandi Award for Best Actor for his performance. By the end of the 1980s Haasan was successful in the Malayalam, Kannada, Telugu and Hindi film industries, with Filmfare Awards in each industry and two national awards.

1990–1998
In 1990, Michael Madana Kama Rajan saw Haasan build on Apoorva Sagodharargal by playing quadruplets. It began as a collaboration with writer Crazy Mohan for future comedy films. Haasan won successive Best Actor awards for his portrayal of deranged, obsessive protagonists in Gunaa and Thevar Magan (which was remade in Hindi as 1997's Virasat). He was credited with the story for the latter. Haasan won his third National Film Award for Best Feature Film in Tamil as a producer for Thevar Magan. The film was India's submission for the Academy Awards that year. A series of films followed: Singaravelan, Maharasan, Kalaignan, Mahanadhi, Nammavar, and Sathi Leelavathi Produced by Haasan, it featured himself alongside Kannada actor Ramesh Aravind and comedian Kovai Sarala. Haasan resumed his collaboration with K. Viswanath in the Telugu film, Subha Sankalpam, and starred in the police story Kuruthipunal (Tamil) simultaneously shot in Telugu as Drohi with Arjun Sarja and won Filmfare Best Actor. Haasan's success in the latter was followed by his third National Film Award for Best Actor for Indian. Haasan also won Tamil Nadu State Film Award for Best Actor and Filmfare Best Actor for Indian. The film was India's submission for the Academy Awards.

'The Week', in its 13 September 1992 edition, reported that Chiranjeevi charged Rs. 12.5 million per a film and which is the highest ever remuneration for any Indian hero then. In 1994, Haasan became the first actor to charge 15 million per film. The highest paid Indian actor from 1970 to 1987 was Rajesh Khanna.

After Indian, Haasan played a woman in the comedy Avvai Shanmughi, which was inspired by Mrs. Doubtfire. He chose Shantanu Sheorey to direct the Hindi remake of Avvai Shanmughi, Chachi 420, but after dissatisfaction with five days of shooting Haasan took over as director. In 1997 Haasan began directing an unfinished biopic of Mohammed Yusuf Khan, Marudhanayagam; a forty five minutes of film and a trailer was shot. Marudhanayagam was expected to be the biggest, most expensive film in Indian cinematic history and his magnum opus; a number of well-known actors and technicians had been signed, and it was launched at a public ceremony by Queen Elizabeth during her 1997 visit to India. Although the film failed to materialise due to budget constraints, Haasan expressed an interest in reviving the project. In 1998, he appeared in Singeetam Srinivasa Rao's romantic comedy, Kaathala Kaathala opposite Prabhu Deva. The film was a commercial success and was dubbed in Hindi as Mirch Masala, which was never released.

2000–2009
After a two-year hiatus from Indian cinema, Haasan decided against reviving Marudhanayagam. He directed his second film, Hey Ram, a period drama, told in flashback, with a fact-based plot centering on the partition of India and the assassination of Mahatma Gandhi. Haasan produced and choreographed the film, writing its screenplay and lyrics; it was India's submission for the Academy Awards that year. Hey Ram was a box-office failure in India but was successful worldwide. Also in 2000, Haasan appeared in the comedy Thenali as a Sri Lankan Tamilian with PTSD who is under a psychiatrist's care. Thenali, starring Malayalam actor Jayaram, was a box-office success. Haasan's next film was 2001's Aalavandhan, in which he played two roles: For one he had his head shaved and gained ten kilograms. To play the other Army major in Aalavandhan, he went to the NDA for a crash course. The Hindi version was distributed by Shringar Films. Despite pre-release publicity, the film was a commercial failure.

After a number of successful comedies including Pammal K. Sambandam and Panchatanthiram and guest appearances, Haasan directed Virumaandi, a film about capital punishment which won the Best Asian Film Award at the Puchon International Fantastic Film Festival. He also appeared in Anbe Sivam with Madhavan. Priyadarshan, its original director, left and Sundar C. completed the film. Anbe Sivam tells the story of Nallasivam, portrayed by Haasan as a communist. His performance was praised by critics, with The Hindu saying that he "has once again done Tamil cinema proud".

In 2004 Haasan appeared in Vasool Raja MBBS, a remake of Bollywood's Munna Bhai M.B.B.S., with Sneha which was a box-office success. The following year, he wrote and starred in the comedy Mumbai Xpress. Released during Tamil New Year, it was a disappointment at the box office despite positive reviews. He appeared Kannada comedy film Rama Shama Bhama with Ramesh Aravind. In 2006 Haasan's long-delayed project, the stylish police story Vettaiyaadu Vilaiyaadu, was a success. Directed by Gautham Vasudev Menon, the film is about a police officer sent to the US to investigate a series of medical murders. In 2008's Dasavathaaram, he played ten roles; the film was released in a number of languages (including Tamil, Telugu and Hindi) throughout India and overseas. Dasavathaaram, written by Haasan and director K. S. Ravikumar, is one of the first modern science-fiction films made in India. Starring Haasan and Asin Thottumkal, it was the highest-grossing Tamil film and his performance was critically praised. In Canada, Dasavathaaram was the first Tamil film distributed by Walt Disney Pictures.

After Dasavathaaram, Haasan directed a film tentatively titled Marmayogi, which stalled after a year of pre-production. He then produced and starred in Unnaipol Oruvan, a remake of the Bollywood film A Wednesday, where he reprised the role originally played by Naseeruddin Shah with Malayalam actor Mohanlal playing Anupam Kher's role. It was released in Telugu as Eeenadu, with Venkatesh reprising the role played by Kher. Both versions were critically acclaimed and commercially successful.

2010–present

Haasan collaborated for the fifth time with Ravikumar in Manmadan Ambu, for which he also wrote the screenplay. The story concerns a man who hires a detective to find out if his fiancée is cheating on him. The film was released in December 2010 to mixed reviews, with Behindwoods calling it "an entertainer, but in parts" and Sify saying it "lacks the punch to captivate the audiences".

Haasan's next film after Manmadhan Ambu was 2013's Vishwaroopam, released in Hindi as Vishwaroop. It won two National Film Awards (Best Production Design and Best Choreography) at the 60th National Film Awards. Muslim groups in Tamil Nadu demanded the ban of the film and claimed, that the film would hurt Muslim sentiments. Although the film was cleared by Central Board of Film Certification of India, district collectors in the state of Tamil Nadu gave orders to the theatre owners to not show Vishwaroopam, citing law and order problems. However, the film was released in other states with greater Muslim populations than in Tamil Nadu. A mutual agreement with the Muslims of Tamil Nadu was finally settled on 2 February 2013, when Haasan accepted to mute five scenes. Vishwaroopam was the highest-grossing Tamil film of 2013.

In May 2014, he was appointed as the official Indian delegate to the 67th Cannes Film Festival. As of July 2014, he was working on three films: Uttama Villain, Vishwaroopam II, the sequel of Vishwaroopam and Papanasam. After 2 years of Vishwaroopam's release, Uttama Villain was released on 2 May 2015 with exceptional critical reviews and on 3 July 2015, Papanasam a Tamil remake of Malayalam film Drishyam was released with positive reviews and became a huge success followed by the bi-lingual Thoongaa Vanam and Cheekati Rajyam, both doing moderate business.

He was set to reprise his role of Balram Naidu (a Telugu RAW Officer) from Dasavathaaram in a spin-off film directed by himself titled Sabaash Naidu. The film was to be made in Tamil, Telugu, and Hindi (as  Shabhash Kundu). The film's release date has been delayed owing to Haasan's entry into politics, and he pledged that he focus on working on Indian 2 instead.

On 17 September 2020, director Lokesh Kanagaraj announced through his Twitter handle that his next venture will have Kamal Haasan in lead role with Anirudh handling the music with the movie titled as Vikram. It was Kamal Hassan's 232nd film as an actor. The film was released on 3 June 2022 and was a huge commercial success grossing  and went on to become the highest-grossing Tamil film of the year and fourth highest-grossing Tamil film of all time by beating the collections made by other Tamil films like Beast, Valimai, Etharkkum Thunindhavan and Don etc. The first single of Vikram titled "Pathala Pathala" received several million views from Kamal Haasan's fans and was the most viewed song on YouTube. 
The song also received praise for Kamal Haasan's dance performances which went viral. Despite facing controversies from the song, it became an instant hit. In August 2022, the filming for Indian 2 resumed, after a break of almost an year. It is now scheduled for release in summer 2023. After Indian 2, he will be collaborating and reuniting with Mahesh Narayanan and Mani Ratnam respectively, for his 233rd and 234th films.

Off-screen contributions
In addition to acting, Haasan is noted for his involvement in other aspects of filmmaking. He has written many of his films, including Raja Paarvai, Apoorva Sagodharargal, Michael Madana Kama Rajan, Thevar Magan, Mahanadhi, Hey Ram, Aalavandhan, Anbe Sivam, Nala Damayanthi, Virumaandi, Dasavathaaram, Manmadan Ambu and Vishwaroopam. Haasan's production company (Raaj Kamal Films International) has produced several of his films, and he directed Chachi 420, Hey Ram, Virumaandi and Vishwaroopam. He considered directing full-time if Hey Ram was successful, but changed his mind when the film failed at the box office. In his earlier career, he choreographed for MGR in Naan Yen Pirandhen, Sivaji Ganesan in Savaale Samaali and Jayalalithaa in Anbu Thangai In 2010 Haasan said he wanted to do more directing, since young actors wished to work for him. When he played supporting roles early in his career he wanted to become a technician and joked: "Film makers like K. Balachander told me that I won't be able make much money by being a technician. So the end result is that the star Kamal funds the technician Kamal in pursuing his dreams". Haasan attended workshops for makeup technicians in the US for several years, and trained as a makeup artist under Michael Westmore.

Haasan has written songs for his films. He wrote the lyrics for a single in Hey Ram, songs in Virumaandi and Unnaipol Oruvan and the album for Manmadhan Ambu. Haasan's musical work has been well received by his peers in Tamil film. He is also a playback singer, singing in Tamil, Hindi, Telugu, Malayalam and English. Haasan also wrote the lyrics for a song about the Coronavirus and released its music video, "Arivum Anbum". The album, composed by Ghibran and directed by Haasan, featured Anirudh Ravichander, Yuvan Shankar Raja and a number of other contemporary performers.

In 2021, Haasan featured in a song 'Shades of Blue: A Musical Tribute to Venmurasu' composed by Rajan Somasundaram and released by Director Mani Ratnam in honor of Venmurasu, the longest novel ever written in any language. Earlier, he has spoken in appreciation of Venmurasu and writer Jeyamohan on Bigg Boss during his book recommendations. In 2022, Haasan was the lyricist and the playback singer for the song "Pathala Pathala" from Vikram.

Bigg Boss Tamil 
Haasan made his return on Star Vijay TV, hosting the first season of Bigg Boss Tamil in 2017. The show soon went onto become one of the most watched television series in Tamil Nadu and gained positive reviews among audience from season 1 onwards. Haasan also hosted the second season of Bigg Boss Tamil 2 which started its telecast on 17 June 2018, Bigg Boss Tamil 3 which started its telecast on 23 June 2019 and Bigg Boss Tamil 4 which started telecast on 4 October 2020. He hosted Bigg Boss Tamil 5 which started to telecast from 3 October 2021. Then, now he is the host to the Bigg Boss Ultimate (Season 1) which is to be launched on Disney+ Hotstar from 30 January 2022. He exited the show after the third week owing to scheduling conflicts with his film Vikram. Later, Silambarasan replaced him as the host from week 4 onwards.

KH House of Khaddar (KHHK) 
Kamal Haasan launched his personal fashion line brand called KH House of Khaddar (KHHK). of Film as Killer in Dhamaka (2022)

Personal life

Family
Haasan was born into a Tamil Iyengar family in the town of Paramakudi, in the Ramanathapuram district of Tamil Nadu, to criminal defence lawyer D. Srinivasan and Rajalakshmi, a housewife. During 2013 his daughter Shruti Haasan appeared on an episode of Neengalum Vellalam Oru Kodi, where "phone a friend" option is availed to Shruti and when she called her father Kamal, he stated that his parents named him Parthasarathy before he was called as Kamal Haasan and his mother always used to call him by that name. In an interview with Karan Thapar, Haasan said his father was literate in Sanskrit. Haasan was the youngest of four children; his siblings are Charuhasan, Chandrahasan and Nalini (Raghu). His two older brothers followed their father's example and studied law. Haasan continued his education in Sir M.Ct. Muthiah Chettiar Boys Higher Secondary School and Hindu Higher Secondary School in Madras (now Chennai).

Haasan has alluded to his parents in some of his works, notably Unnaipol Oruvan and in the song "Kallai Mattum" in Dasavathaaram. His oldest brother Charuhasan, like Haasan, is a National Film Award-winning actor who appeared in the Kannada film Tabarana Kathe. Charuhasan's daughter Suhasini is also a National Film Award winner married to director (and fellow award-winner) Mani Ratnam, who collaborated with Haasan on 1987's Nayakan. Chandrahasan has produced several of Haasan's films and was an executive with Raaj Kamal Films International, he died in March 2017. Chandrahasan's daughter Anu Hasan has had supporting roles in several films, including Suhasini's Indira. Haasan's sister, Nalini Raghu, is a dance teacher for whom he named an auditorium (Nalini Mahal). Her son, Gautham, played Haasan's grandson in "Hey Ram".

Relationships

In 1978, at age 24, Haasan married dancer Vani Ganapathy. She acted with Haasan in the 1975 movie Melnaattu Marumagal. After marriage, Vani worked as Haasan's costume designer for several movies. They divorced ten years later.

Haasan and actress Sarika began living together in 1988, marrying after the birth of their first child, Shruti (born 1986). Shruti is a singer and a Tollywood-Kollywood actress. Their younger daughter, Akshara (born 1991), was assistant director for 2013's Vishwaroopam and actress for 2019's Kadaram Kondan. Sarika stopped acting soon after their marriage, Sarika worked as Haasan's costume designer for the movie Hey Ram and won the National Film Award for Best Costume Designer. In 2002, the couple filed for divorce, which became final in 2004. After their divorce, Sarika acted in movies and TV serials, winning the National Film Award for Best Actress for the 2005 film Parzania.

From 2005 until 2016, Haasan was in a relationship with actress Gautami, his frequent co-star during the late 1980s and early 1990s. Gautami had announced on her blog that she had ended her relationship with him writing, "It is heartbreaking for me to have to say today that I and Mr. Haasan are no longer together. After almost 13 years together, it has been one of the most devastating decisions that I have ever had to make in my life."

Early in his career, he co-starred in several films with Srividya. Haasan visited Srividya on her deathbed in 2006.

Views
Haasan is an atheist. He has often questioned the existence of God and has highlighted the theme in his films like Anbe Sivam and Dasavathaaram. He was mistaken to be Muslim because of his Arabic-sounding name, most notably when he was denied preclearance to travel to the United States by Customs and Border Protection authorities at Toronto Pearson International Airport in 2002.

In Sanskrit Kamal means "lotus", but it was rumoured that his name originated with a friend of his father (Yaakob Hassan, a Muslim freedom fighter who was imprisoned along with Kamal's father by the British). In a BBC interview with Karan Thapar, Haasan said that his last name derives from the Sanskrit word hasya, and although the Yaakob Hassan connection was publicised by the media it was only "a story". Haasan is considered left-leaning or independent. Although he initially abstained from politics, he entered regional politics in Tamil Nadu in 2018. He also said that his entering politics would result in his death within a year.

Filmography

Humanitarian work

Haasan is the first Tamil actor to convert his fan clubs into welfare organisations and is involved in social-service activities through the clubs under the name Kamal Narpani Iyakkam (Kamal Welfare Association). His fan clubs help organise blood- and eye-donation drives, and donate educational materials to students.

Haasan received the first Abraham Kovoor National Award for his humanist activities and secular life in 2004. He was project ambassador for Hridayaragam 2010, which raised funds for an orphanage for HIV/AIDS-affected children. In September 2010 Haasan launched a children's cancer relief fund and gave roses to children with cancer at Sri Ramachandra University in Porur, Chennai. He has pledged his product-endorsement income to social causes. Haasan, along with his partner Gautami, won  5 million on Neengalum Vellalam Oru Kodi in March 2013 and donated the prize money to Petral Thaan Pillaya, a nonprofit organization supporting cancer patients.

Haasan was nominated by the Indian Prime Minister Narendra Modi for the Swachh Bharat campaign. He chose to clean the Madambakkam lake in Chennai with the Environmentalist Foundation of India's Arun Krishnamurthy on 7 November 2014.

Known for refusing any kind of brand endorsement, Haasan endorsed Pothys for the first time in 2015. His daughter, Shruti has previously endorsed Pothys. In the past, Haasan has stated that should he ever act in commercials, the revenue earned from them would be donated to HIV affected children.

Writings
Haasan publishes the magazine Mayyam, by the Kamal Haasan Welfare Association (Narpani Iyakkam).His views on cinema, child and drug abuse, and the Kashmir conflict have been published as Thedi Theerpom Va (Come, Let's Find and Solve) by his fan club. He is also interested in Tamil literature.

Political career
He formed the centrist party Makkal Needhi Maiam (MNM), a regional political party in Tamil Nadu. He formally announced the party's formation on 21 February 2018 in Madurai. The party's flag displays six joined hands in a circle in alternate red and white colours with a white star at its centre in a black background. Haasan began his political journey from late President A. P. J. Abdul Kalam's residence and his memorial at Rameswaram. His party contested in 37 seats in 2019 Indian general election and lost. Makkal Needhi Maiam's vote share in the 2019 Lok Sabha election was 3.72% (in the seats it contested).

He unsuccessfully contested the 2021 Tamil Nadu Legislative Assembly election from Coimbatore South and lost to BJP Mahila Morcha President Vanathi Srinivasan by a narrow margin.

Elections contested

Awards and honours

Haasan received, in 1990, the Padma Shri, and, in 2014, the Padma Bhushan for his contributions to Indian cinema. At age six, he won the President's Gold Medal for Best Child Actor for his debut film, Kalathur Kannamma. He is tied with Mammootty for the second most Best Actor National Film Awards with three. He won a National Film Award for Best Feature Film in Tamil for producing the 1992 Tamil film, Thevar Magan. He has a record 19 Filmfare Awards in five languages; after his last award, in 2000, he wrote to the organisation requesting no further awards. In 2003, his films Hey Ram, Pushpak, Nayakan and Kuruthipunal were showcased in the "Director in Focus" category at the Rotterdam Film Festival. In 2004, Virumaandi won the inaugural Best Asian film award at the Puchon International Fantastic Film Festival (PiFan).

In 2005, Sathyabama Deemed University awarded Haasan an honorary doctorate. He received the Chevalier Sivaji Ganesan Award for Excellence in Indian Cinema at the inaugural Vijay Awards in 2006. He received the Living Legend Award in 2007 from FICCI. In 2010, the United Progressive Alliance government organised a retrospective of his films. Union Information and Broadcasting Minister Ambika Soni said the actor was unique, since his films broke regional and language barriers. That year, the government of Kerala honoured him for 50 years in Indian cinema during statewide Onam celebrations in Thiruvananthapuram.

Haasan received the Kalaimamani Award from the government of Tamil Nadu in 1979. Other honours include Tamil Nadu State Film Awards, Nandi, Screen and Vijay Awards, including four awards for his performance in Dasavathaaram. In 2009 he was appointed chairman of the Federation of Indian Chambers of Commerce and Industry (FICCI) Media and Entertainment Business Conclave, organised by FICCI's entertainment division. He is on the academic advisory council for ISFM (International school of Film+Media), and was the first Indian actor invited aboard an American ship as a special friend of the US. In April 2013 he received an award on behalf of Indian cinema from Chris Brown, executive vice-president for conventions and business operations of the National Association of Broadcasters, as part of the New York Festivals International Film & TV Awards. He is one of 20 film celebrities recognised by Coca-Cola India with the launch of the 24th edition of the Limca Book of Records in 2013. Recently honoured with S. S. Vasan Award for his lifetime achievement in film industry by Ananda Vikatan.

Public perception

Mani Ratnam who directed Haasan in Nayakan, has said that there are many things he can do that no other actor can. Veteran Tamil actor Nagesh called Haasan the best actor he had ever seen. His contributions to the film industry have been praised by his contemporaries, including Mohanlal, Prithviraj Sukumaran, Sridevi, Amitabh Bachchan, Mammootty, Venkatesh, Shah Rukh Khan and Aamir Khan. Younger generation actors (Suriya and Madhavan) and filmmakers (Bala, Ameer and Gautham Menon) have been inspired by him.

Hollywood filmmaker Barrie M. Osburne called Haasan's knowledge of literature, history and films "encyclopedic", and Ang Lee said he was stunned by his brilliance and knowledge of films. Some of his films were inspiration for some Hollywood films.

'The Week', in its 13 September 1992 edition, reported that Chiranjeevi charged Rs. 12.5 million per film, which was the highest remuneration for an Indian actor at the time. In 1994, Haasan became the first Indian actor to charge 15 million per film.

In 2015, Haasan was criticised by the-then Tamil Nadu Finance Minister O. Panneerselvam, who stated that Haasan was "confused" and had "blabbered", unaware of the ground reality for his statement on the government's response to rain relief efforts. Haasan was also criticised by Nayakan producer Muktha Srinivasan for his article in The Hindu taking unnecessary credit for that film.

Haasan has been accused of self-indulgence, and has been criticised for sexually explicit scenes and themes, offending religious sentiments and superficiality on social issues depicted in his films. There have also been complaints about his obsession with perfection, which may have caused some of his films to run over budget. In November 2017, Haasan said that right-wing Hindus have started employing extremism to propagate their communal agenda.

See also
 Kamal Haasan's unrealized projects 
 Raaj Kamal Films International
 Makkal Needhi Maiam
 Haasan family

Notes

References

External links

 
Living people
1954 births
Male actors from Chennai
Filmfare Awards winners
20th-century Indian film directors
Indian atheists
Indian male film actors
Indian male screenwriters
Film producers from Chennai
Indian humanitarians
Male actors in Hindi cinema
Male actors in Kannada cinema
Male actors in Malayalam cinema
Male actors in Telugu cinema
Male actors in Tamil cinema
Tamil male actors
Tamil film directors
Tamil film producers
Tamil playback singers
Tamil screenwriters
Tamil film poets
Tamil Nadu State Film Awards winners
People from Ramanathapuram district
Best Actor National Film Award winners
Nandi Award winners
Recipients of the Rashtrapati Award
20th-century Indian male actors
21st-century Indian male actors
Recipients of the Padma Bhushan in arts
Recipients of the Padma Shri in arts
Indian male child actors
20th-century Indian composers
Chevaliers of the Ordre des Arts et des Lettres
21st-century Indian film directors
Hindi-language film directors
Tamil-language film directors
20th-century Indian dramatists and playwrights
21st-century Indian dramatists and playwrights
Indian Tamil people
Screenwriters from Tamil Nadu
Indian actor-politicians
Indian political party founders
Makkal Needhi Maiam politicians
Zee Cine Awards winners